Spilarctia melanostigma is a moth in the family Erebidae. It was described by Nikolay Grigoryevich Erschoff in 1872. It is found in Uzbekistan, Kyrgyzstan, Hissar, Pamirs, Afghanistan, Pakistan and from the Himalayas to Sikkim and Assam.

References

Moths described in 1872
melanostigma